Mother of Disease is a full-length album created by Puissance in 1998. A remastered reissue was released in 2008 with one bonus track called The Dancing Clowns.

Track listing 
 "Light of a Dead Sun" 05:05
 "Reign of Dying Angels" 05:02
 "Mother of Disease" 05:56
 "In Shining Armour" 04:34
 "Post Ruin Symphony" 06:49
 "Core of Revelation" 05:07
 "Human Error" 05:03
 "The Voice of Chaos" 06:55
 "The Dancing Clowns" 04:03 [Only available on 2008 version]

1998 albums